Dror  may refer to:

 Dror (name), a surname or given name
 Dror-Israel, an educational movement
 Dror light machine gun, an Israeli weapon
 Habonim Dror, a Jewish Labour Zionist youth movement